The 2016 Cyprus Women's Cup was the ninth edition of the Cyprus Women's Cup, an invitational women's football tournament held annually in Cyprus. After being initially canceled due to schedule conflicts with both UEFA and AFC qualification for the 2016 Summer Olympics and the 2016 SheBelieves Cup leaving many of the prior year's participants, including reigning champions England, unable to attend, the tournament was rescheduled with the Football Association of Finland as tournament organizers and a scaled-down field of eight national teams.

Austria defeated Poland in a final between two first-time participants in the Cyprus Cup.

Format
The tournament consisted of a group stage held over three match days followed by a single day of classification matches to determine the final standings.

For the group stage, the eight teams were split into two groups of four teams. Each group played a round-robin tournament with each team playing one match against each other team in its group.

The classification day then had four matches: a first place match between the group winners, a third place match between the runners-up, a fifth place match between the third-placed teams, and a seventh place match between the bottom teams.

Tie-breaking criteria
For the group stage of this tournament, where two or more teams in a group tied on an equal number of points, the finishing positions will be determined by the following tie-breaking criteria in the following order:
 number of points obtained in the matches among the teams in question
 goal difference in all the group matches
 number of goals scored in all the group matches
 drawing of lots

Venues

Teams

For the first time in Cyprus Cup history, all participants were from UEFA. Austria, Hungary, Poland, and Wales all made their first appearance in the tournament. Also for the first time, Finland was named "host nation" as the Football Association of Finland organized the tournament. Prior co-organisers the Netherlands were instead hosting the 2016 UEFA Women's Olympic Qualifying Tournament, England instead competed in the 2016 SheBelieves Cup, and Scotland were controversially kept away by their performance director Brian McClair, who preferred to play a single friendly against Spain in Falkirk.

Squads

Group stage

Group A

Group B

Knockout stage

Seventh place match

Fifth place match

Third place match

Final

Final standings

Goalscorers

3 goals
 Nina Burger
 Lucie Voňková

2 goals

 Simona Necidová

1 goal

 Nicole Billa
 Katharina Schiechtl
 Sarah Zadrazil
 Jenny Danielsson
 Adelina Engman
 Maija Saari
 Henrietta Csiszár
 Viktória Szabó
 Fanny Vágó
 Bernadett Zágor
 Barbara Bonansea
 Marta Carissimi
 Melania Gabbiadini
 Cristiana Girelli
 Alia Guagni
 Daniela Sabatino
 Silvana Chojnowski
 Ewelina Kamczyk
 Ewa Pajor
 Martyna Wiankowska
 Ruesha Littlejohn
 Katie McCabe
 Louise Quinn
 Chloe Chivers
 Charlie Estcourt
 Kayleigh Green
 Helen Ward

References

External links
Official website
Results at Women's Soccer United

2016
Cyprus Cup
Cyprus Cup